Calidota paulina is a moth of the family Erebidae. It was described by E. Dukinfield Jones in 1912. It is found in Brazil.

References

Phaegopterina
Moths described in 1912